Bradley is a village and civil parish in Staffordshire, England. The population of the civil parish at the 2011 census was 513. It is located close to the A518 road leading to the villages of Haughton and Gnosall towards Telford.

Notable people 

 Benjamin Broomhall (1829 – 1911) a British advocate of foreign missions, administrator of the China Inland Mission, and author, born in Bradley.
 Wilf Phillips (1895 – 1976) an English footballer who played 292 professional games, born in Bradley.

See also
Listed buildings in Bradley, Staffordshire

References

Villages in Staffordshire
Civil parishes in Staffordshire
Borough of Stafford